Pha Mueang (full name Pho Khun Pha Mueang, ; late 12th century – mid 13th century) was a Thai nobleman and general who was the Lord of Rad and played a significant role in the founding of the Sukhothai Kingdom.

Origin
Pha Mueang is said to be a descendant of Nam Thum, a hero whose name is mentioned in the legends of many Tai peoples. Pha Mueang's ultimate origin is described by his grandfather in the so-called "Ram Khamhaeng": he is the ruler of a city-state called Mueang Rat (เจ้าเมืองราด). The location of Mueang Rat is disputed. Many believe that it could be found in the valley of the Pasak. Therefore, the inhabitants of the Phetchabun district Lom Sak built a large statue of Pha Mueang (อนุสาวรีย์พ่อขุนผาเมือง). The historian Alexander Brown Griswold, however, is of the opinion that Mueang Rat must have been located in the valley of the Nan River near Uttaradit due to geographical characteristics.

The "God of Sri Mueang Sodharapura" (God: ผีฟ้า, corresponding to Skt Deva raja), the king of Angkor, bestowed the titles of "Sri Indraditya" together with the "sword of victory" (Phrasaeng Chaisri, พระแสงชัยศรี) upon Pha Mueang and he additionally received the "Kamrateng An Pha Mueang" or "กมรเตง อัญ ผาเมือง"". At the same time he was given Nang Sikhara Mahadevi, a "daughter" of King Jayavarman VII of the Chenla. An "oath of loyalty" to Angkor was probably demanded as well.

Bang Klang Hao
Little is known of the history of Bang Klang Hao (full name: Pho Khun Bang Hao, พ่อขุนบางกลางหาว). He was a friend and ally of Pha Mueang. Bang Klang Hao was ruler of the city-state Mueang Bang Yang (เจ้าเมืองบางยาง), its location also unknown. Griswold suspected it was located somewhere between Mueang Rat and Mueang Si Satchanalai, possibly even at today's Ban Yang, which is situated about seven kilometres south of New Sukhothai.

Liberation from the Khmer rule
After Jayavarman VII died in 1220, the power of Angkor dwindled in the northwestern regions. The commander Khom Samat Klon Lamphong (ขอมสมาดโขลญลำพง) held an outpost of the Khmer Empire in Sukhothai.

In "Inscription II" it is described that at some point, probably around 1238–1240, Pha Mueang marched his army united with Bang Klang Hao towards Sukhothai. In the ensuing battle at the gates of the city, Bang Klang Hao fought against Khom Samat Klon Lamphong, both from the back of their war elephants: "The bold Klon Lamphong was completely defeated".

After the defeat of the Khmer troops, Pha Mueang entrusted the government of Sukhothai to Bang Klang Hao. He then retired with his men to Si Satchanalai. A little later Bang Klang Hao was ordained by Pha Mueang as "Chao Mueang Sukhothai" (ruler of Sukhothai, เจ้าเมืองสุโขทัย). Here Pha Mueang transferred his title "Sri Indraditya" to his comrades in arms. The new king of Sukhothai also received the "sword of victory" as a sign of his success and the palladium of the New Kingdom. Sri Indraditya is now regarded as the founder of the Phra Ruang Dynasty, the Kingdom of Sukhothai.

Consorts
 Phra Nang Singkhondevi, daughter of the king Jayavarman VII. Appointed to the Queen Consorts.
 Phra Nang Naovarongdevi, consorts had married before marriage with Phra Nang Singkhondevi.

References

Further reading
Griswold, A. B. Towards a History of Sukhothai Art. The Fine Arts Department, Bangkok 1967.
Griswold, A. B.; Na Nagara, Prasert. Epigraphic and Historical Studies, No.10: "King Lodaiya of Sukhodaya and his contemporaries." The Siam Society, Bangkok, 1972
Rooney, Dawn F. Ancient Sukhothai, Thailand's Cultural Heritage. River Books, Bangkok 2008, 

13th-century births
14th-century deaths
13th-century Thai people
Tai history
Thai generals
Thai princes
14th-century Thai people
Year of birth missing
Year of death missing